Vice-Admiral Sir Edward Michael Conolly Abel Smith,  (3 December 1899 – 3 December 1985) was a Royal Navy officer who served during the First and Second World Wars.

Family
Conolly Abel Smith (as he was usually known) was the second son of Eustace Abel Smith, JP, a banker of Longhills House, Branston, Lincolnshire, and Aileen Geta Katherine Conolly, the daughter of Colonel John Augustus Conolly, VC.

Naval career
Abel Smith entered the Royal Naval College, Osborne, in September 1912, at the age of 13, continuing his training at Royal Naval College, Dartmouth. From 1915 he served aboard the battlecruiser , receiving promotion to sub-lieutenant on 15 May 1918, and to lieutenant on 15 May 1920.

On 16 June 1924 Abel Smith was attached to the Royal Air Force, who were in control of all naval aviation at that time, with the rank of flying officer, to attend No. 1 Flying Training School at Netheravon, Wiltshire. From 23 October 1925 he was stationed at HMS Columbine, the naval base at Port Edgar in the Firth of Forth, then from 3 April 1926 served as the Flight Commander of No. 403 Flight FAA aboard the carrier  on the China Station, receiving promotion to flight lieutenant on 1 January 1928 and to lieutenant-commander on 15 May 1928. From 3 March 1929 he served aboard the heavy cruiser , and from 20 March 1930 on the carrier  in the Mediterranean Fleet, firstly as the Flight Commander of No. 408 Flight, then as Squadron Commander of Fighter Squadron 802 FAA. He was promoted to squadron leader on 1 January 1933 and commander on 30 June 1933.

From 14 May 1934 Abel Smith attended a tactical course at Portsmouth Naval Base, and from 3 September 1934 he served in the Naval Air Division of the Admiralty in London. On 8 December 1936 he was appointed commanding officer of the cruiser  in the Mediterranean, receiving promotion to wing commander on 1 January 1937. From 2 January 1939 he was attached to the Admiralty, serving as Naval Equerry to King George VI.

In August 1939 he was appointed Commander (Flying) in the carrier  which was sunk by a U-boat on 17 September 1939 off the south coast of Ireland, losing half her complement. He received promotion to captain on 30 June 1940. In January 1942 he was appointed Commanding Officer of the escort carrier , and received a Mention in Despatches for his efforts during the invasion of North Africa ("Operation Torch"). He returned to shore duty in July 1943 to serve as commander of HMS Heron (RNAS Yeovilton). From 28 March 1944 he was the Assistant Naval Attaché (from 26 September 1944 the Naval Attaché) and the Naval Air Attaché at the British Embassy, Washington, D.C. until early 1946.

On 24 June 1946 Abel Smith was appointed flag captain of the carrier , serving until May 1949. On 8 July 1949 he was promoted to rear-admiral. From 1950 to 1951 he served as Vice-Controller (Air), Chief of Naval Air Equipment and Chief Naval Representative to the Ministry of Supply.

Abel Smith retired on 14 February 1958 and was appointed Lord Lieutenant of Selkirkshire on the 16th, serving until 1975. He also served as a Justice of the Peace, and as an Extra Naval Equerry to Queen Elizabeth II.

Personal life
On 28 December 1932 Abel Smith married Lady Mary Elizabeth Carnegie (1899–1996), daughter of Charles Carnegie, 10th Earl of Southesk, at St Andrew's Church, Brechin. They had one daughter (b. 1936) and one son (b. 1939).

Cultural references
Conolly Abel-Smith has been portrayed on screen by Adrian Lukis in the second season of The Crown.

Awards and honours
 Companion of the Order of the Bath (CB), 7 June 1951
 Grand Cross of the Royal Victorian Order (GCVO), 1 January 1958
 Knight Commander of the Royal Victorian Order (KCVO), 25 May 1954
 Commander of the Royal Victorian Order (CVO), 13 June 1946
Also:
 Commander 1st class of the Order of the Dannebrog (Denmark), May 1957
 Grand Cross of the Military Order of Aviz (Portugal), February 1957
 Grand Cross of the Order of St. Olav (Norway), June 1955

References

External links
 

1899 births
1985 deaths
Graduates of Britannia Royal Naval College
Royal Navy officers of World War I
Royal Navy admirals of World War II
Companions of the Order of the Bath
Knights Grand Cross of the Royal Victorian Order
Commanders First Class of the Order of the Dannebrog
Grand Crosses of the Order of Aviz
Conolly
People educated at the Royal Naval College, Osborne
People from North Kesteven District
Military personnel from Lincolnshire